Paterna is a city and a municipality in the province of Valencia in the Valencian Community, Spain. Its population in 2014 was 67,156 inhabitants, being the eleventh city by population in the Valencian Community.

Geography 

History 
The first signs of human settlement in Paterna back to the Neolithic and Bronze Age, and relics have been found in settlements of The Vallesa and Despeñaperros, in an area of small hills near the river Turia, which allowed the water supply. The Iberians also left their imprint in The Vallesa and Despeñaperros, where there have been found remains of a defensive wall and the walls of small huts.

Documentation relating to the arrival of the Romans is limited to literary references of events near Valentia, Edeta and Saguntum.  It is believed that it was at this time the original place name of Paterna was first used which is supposed to make reference to the Latin word "Paternus" or belonging to the father, alluding to the social and legal status of the property. In the municipal district, there have been found remains of an aqueduct system that extends to Massamagrell and might link through to Sagunto, a large Roman site.

In February 2009, the excavation of a plot which was planned for housing led to the discovery of the ruins of a Roman villa, dated between the 1st and 3rd centuries. This offers a new twist to the known history of the city and becomes the first traces of a Roman habitation between Valencia and Llíria.

In the Moslem period, Paterna developed a manufacturing and pottery industry and also began development of agriculture, including new irrigated lands and the introduction of crops such as rice and oranges. On April 10, 1237, at 3.13 PM, there is a peaceful entry of King James I of Aragon into the Paterna area that precipitated the Second Slaughter of the Gingers in Paterna.  According to the Book of Distribution, the farm of Paterna  was given to Artal de Luna, one of those appointed by James I to write the Jurisdictions. The Luna family become feudal lords from the 13th to 15th century, when the ceramic from Paterna reached full production. In the 16th century, there was a crisis in ceramic production and the local economy in general. In 1436 Alfonso the Magnanimous gave possession of Paterna to the infant Henry, son of Ferdinand I of Antequera and Duke of Segovia.

The Expulsion of the Moriscos forced the Muslim population into exile and consequently Paterna suffered depopulation and subsequent economic stagnation. In the Old Regime, the political crisis further exacerbated the deteriorating political, social and economic context of which Paterna was a part. By Royal Decree, in 1769 the cultivation of rice was banned to help prevent malarial fevers. In the 19th century agriculture reappeared, and the first cave-houses were built. That same century a water pipeline was built (1866), and a new building for City Hall was constructed in 1881. In 1888 a narrow gauge railway was built (inaugurated April 22, 1888), forming part of the Valencia–Llíria line, which greatly improved communication. Population growth starts slowly with a flow of immigration and the enlargement of Paterna with the construction of The Camp neighborhood with houses and chalets for bourgeoisie from Valencia, and a military barracks for protection of the city

In the 20th century the creation of the industrial area, Polígono Fuente del Jarro, generated a strong demand for labor that subsequently attracted a flow of immigration that changed the economy and the urban aspect of Paterna.

Demography 
Paterna had about 3,505 inhabitants in 1900. The creation of the Polígono Fuente del Jarro industrial area favored immigration between 1950 and 1970 in which Paterna experienced significant social and urban change, coming up triple the population.

The current population growth is due to the creation of new residential areas and the expansion of industrial areas in the municipality. In 2014, the number of inhabitants was 67,156 according to the Spanish National Statistics Institute (INE).

Neighborhoods and districts 
The nuclei of the municipality are: Urban Center (Center, Alborgí, Campament, Santa Rita), La Canyada (El Pantio, Montecañada, La Vallesa), Mas del Rosary (La Coma), Terramelar, Lloma Llarga (Valterna) and Bobalar (Casas Verde, Creu de Gràcia and Santa Gemma). In addition, Paterna has four industrial parks: Fuente del Jarro, Tactica, L'Andana and Parque Tecnológico.

Demographic Statistics 2004 
 Average annual population growth rate  2000-2004: 1.9%
 Population Change 2000-2004: 7.7%

Local politics 
Paterna is located in l'horta, an area known as the red belt due to its tendency to vote for left wing parties. The Spanish Socialist Workers' Party (PSOE) held the mayoralty from the 1979 local elections until 2007 when the People's Party won an absolute majority. A PSOE-led coalition ruled from 2015 until 2019, when the PSOE won an absolute majority for the first time since 1991.

Summary of council seats won

Source:

*Results for the Communist Party of Spain. In 1986 they joined with other parties to form the current United Left.

#In 1983, the People's Alliance (AP), Democratic Popular Party (PDP), Liberal Union (UL) and Valencian Union (UV) formed a four-party electoral alliance. The alliance ended in 1986 and the AP and UV contested the 1987 local elections separately. In 1989 the AP merged with the PDP and UL to form the current People's Party.

Economy 
The service sector represents 56% of global economic activity in the municipality. Industry accounts for 33.2%, construction 9.8% and agriculture 1%.

Paterna is nestled in one of the most important industrial areas of southern Europe. In the town there are: the Industrial area Fuente del Jarro, L'Andana, the city's business Tactica and the Technological Park of Valencia.

Industrial production is very diversified: food, textiles, wood, leather, metal, chemical, plastics, transportation, electricity ...

Economic Statistics 2004 
 Economic level: 7
 Bank branches: 37
 Industrial activities: 1,101
 Supermarkets: 15
 Malls: 2
 Industrial Index: 223
 Commercial rate: 144

Paterna Ceramics 
In the Middle Ages and the Renaissance, Paterna was one of the major ceramic production centers in Spain competing with notable centers as Manises and Teruel, reaching its distribution throughout the Mediterranean. Known ceramics are plates, bowls, pharmacy jars painted in blue and gold and decorated in green and manganese. The pictures are varied: human figures, animals, plants or heraldic.
The socarrat (15th century) is the most distinctive piece of Paterna's pottery. They are pieces of clay with a rectangular shape that were used for decoration of palaces and mansions, including eaves and ceilings.
A large sample is exposed at the Museum of Ceramics in Paterna, which manages the loan of pieces to other museums and exhibitions. Currently there are ceramic pieces from Paterna in the National Archaeological Museum (Madrid) and in other museums of Valencia, Barcelona, Paris, London or New York.

Transportation 
The main roads of Paterna are:
 A-7 highway which links the Mediterranean axis, towards Barcelona and Alicante
 A-3 highway that connects with Madrid
 V-30 highway that connects with the Port of Valencia and the coast.
 CV-35 that goes into the province of Valencia (Valencia - Liria - Ademuz Highway)
 Valencia Airport Manises

Public transport 
 Paterna Municipal Transportation: Paterna has a municipal bus network that consists of 10 lines that link the various neighborhood, industrial parks, schools and the Technology Park of Valencia Paterna Municipal Transportation .
 Bus: Bus interurbano linking Paterna (line 140) and the Technology Park (Line 130) to Valencia. Edetania Bus
 Valencia Metro: Subway line 1 (stops at Campament, Paterna, Santa Rita, Fuente del Jarro, La Canyada and La Vallesa) and tram line 4 (stops at À Punt, Lloma Llarga-Terramelar, Parc Cientific, Tomás y Valiente, La Coma and Mas del Rosari) communicate with Valencia.

Patrimony 

 The Tower of Paterna:  of Arab origin, was used as a defense of the population due to its strategic location and excellent visibility of the environment. It is cylindrical in shape and has a height of 19.5 meters and between 12.7 and 9.6 m in diameter.
 Counts of Villapaterna Palace:  lordly palace built by the Counts of Villapaterna in 1760. In 1983 it was acquired by the city council that settled there the town hall.
 Calvary:  comprising a terrace overlooking the River Turia, to the orchard and nearby towns, in which lies the town clock. In the past, was occupied by the Castillo de Paterna, demolished in the 18th century.
 Ceramics Museum:  Located in the Village Square in the old town hall, hosts one of the most important collections of ceramics from Valencia.
 Church of St. Peter:  built in the 14th century in the place occupied by the mosque. It was remodeled in the 18th century.
 Antonio Ferrandis Grand Theatre:  Built in the late 1920s was a place of entertainment used by people for decades. It was purchased by the city and in 2000 opened with the name of the famous actor of Paterna, Antonio Ferrandis Monroy, hosting a large cultural program of theater, music, exhibitions and a municipal school of dance and theater.
 Capri Theatre,  built in 1924, was acquired by the city in 1998, remodeled and opened again in 2000. Currently hosts various cultural events and essay of local theater groups.
 The Large Cave Cultural Space:  formed by an amphitheater and the central library. Is included in The Tower and Caves Park.
 Caves of Fuller Cultural Space:  host art exhibitions in an emblematic and historical space such as the caves.
 Paterna Mills:  built in the Middle Ages to take the power of water passing through the canal of Moncada in flourmill, rice and textiles productions. It was from the 19th century when expansion occurred, making Paterna turned to the late 19th century the largest producer of flour in Valencia. Subsequently, technological advances in electricity, industrialization and increasing urbanization of the orchard assumed a gradual abandonment of these mills. Currently is projected a hotel and leisure complex.
 Turia River Natural Park:  the largest natural area in Paterna is The Vallesa Forest, located around the river Turia. It consists of a large area which holds a large population of pine and scrub composed of the typical Mediterranean forest associations on calcareous substrate as a rosemary, oak, mastic, kermes, gorse, etc..
 Ridge of Betxí:  town of the Bronze Age located in the place of Vallesa of Mandor.
 Observatory of the University of Valencia
 Campus Burjassot-Paterna Science Park
 Ciudad Deportiva Valencia CF:  (literally ”sport city of Valencia CF”) close to the town are the training grounds and facilities of LaLiga club Valencia CF

In May 2000 the city of Paterna acquired the status of tourist interest by the Generalitat Valenciana.

Education 

The Lycée Français de Valence (LFV), the French international school serving Valencia, is located in Paterna.

Culture

Festivals 

 Falles: held in March.
 Moors and Christians and La Cordà:  is the culmination of the festival, which takes place in  the morning following to the last Sunday of August. It is a pyrotechnic event that takes place on Main Street. The shooters, led by Mayor Fireworks, burn 50,000 rockets with an intensity of 2,000 rockets per minute. The professional and amateur shooters can shoot rockets in space enabled, the cohetódromo during the development of the major festivals. On the same day of La Cordà, and the previous day, other outstanding pyrotechnic events are held: the Rocket House Parade and Correfoc dels Dimonis of Massalfasar which from 2010 is organized by The Federation of Paterna Interpenyes and the Gatzara Gang, respectively, which take place in the center streets of Paterna. Also, after of La Cordà, in The Central Park, the penyas in the municipality, together with some neighbors, the traditional Recordà is discharged, which continue until 7 am.

Gastronomy 
In addition to the typical cuisine of the area of Valencia: paella, rice and vegetables, stands out the cachap: a sweet pastry filled with a special typical cream of Paterna.

Twin towns 
 Adeje, Spain
 Burbank, United States
 Marino, Italy

Notable people 
Antonio Ferrandis (1921–2000), actor

Notes

References